Platycapnos is a genus of flowering plants belonging to the family Papaveraceae.

Its native range is Canary Islands, Western and Central Mediterranean.

Species:

Platycapnos saxicola 
Platycapnos spicatus 
Platycapnos tenuilobus

References

Papaveraceae
Papaveraceae genera